Al Valdes (born c. 1935) is a retired Canadian football player who played for the Calgary Stampeders.

References

Living people
1930s births
Canadian football running backs
Calgary Stampeders players